Altai Khairkhan is an overtone singing ensemble from Mongolia founded in 2002 by Childeegiin Palamjav, Sambuugiin Pürevjav and Ejeegiin Toivgoo.

Style and lyrical themes 

The members are from Uvs aimag, situated in the west of Mongolia near the Altai Mountains. Thus, the songs are often a praise to the mountains, rivers and animals of western Mongolia.

The band performs either songs of their own composition or Mongolian traditional songs using morin khuur, topshur and a range of overtone singing techniques called Khöömii.

Members 

Current members

 Palamjavyn Lkhamjav (Паламжавын Лхамжав) – topshur, overtone singing
 Sambuugiin Pürevjav (Самбуугийн Пүрэвжав) – morin khuur, singing
 Yansangiin Suglegmaa (Янсангийн Сүглэгмаа) – yatga
 Lkhagvasurengiin Lkhamragchaa (Лхагвасүрэнгийн Лхамрагчаа) – topshur, overtone singing

Former members

 Childeegiin Palamjav (Чилдээгийн Паламжав) – topshur, overtone singing, dance
 Ejeegiin Toivgoo (Эжээгийн Тойвгоо) – topshur, overtone singing

Discography 

 2003 : Whistle in the Wind (album)

 2009 : Altai Khairkhan (video)

References

External links 
 Facebook page
 MySpace page

Throat singing
Mongolian traditional music groups
Musical groups established in 2002
2002 establishments in Mongolia